Softex S.A. is a Greek paper towel company, headquartered in Athens, west of downtown. The company is located at the Acteon Building in Irinis Street, Neo Faliro, Athens. The first owner of the company was Apostolos Nikolaidis.

It manufactures paper towels and napkins and had two factories, in Athens and Drama. Softex suffered a fire in August 1994 that destroyed its machines, building and shipping centre. The company operated from other premises until the factory was rebuilt with fireproof technology.

External links
 Bolton Group webpage

Manufacturing companies based in Athens
Pulp and paper companies of Greece
Greek brands